Neo-Medieval music is a modern popular music characterized by elements of Medieval music and early music in general. Music styles within neo-Medieval music vary from authentic performance interpretations of Medieval music (understood as Classical music) to crossover genres that blend Medieval instruments, such as bagpipe, shawm and hurdy-gurdy with electronic music and rock. In many cases, it is more or less overlapping with styles such as folk rock, British folk rock and neofolk.

Bands specializing in neo-Medieval music are particularly plentiful in Germany, although the genre also enjoys some popularity in North America, the Czech Republic, the Netherlands, France, United Kingdom, Italy and the Scandinavian countries.

History
It is difficult to point to the exact origins of neo-Medieval music. One could argue that all Medieval-sounding tunes written after the Middle Ages are in some way neo-Medieval music; this definition would include music from as early as the Renaissance and onwards. Other examples of early neo-Medievalism in music would also include a number of Romantic composers such as Niels W. Gade, Edvard Grieg, and Felix Mendelssohn (who often used Medieval- and folk-style tunes in their music), as well as parts of the Carmina Burana by Carl Orff, and many movie soundtracks from the 20th century.

However, as a popular music form, the birth of neo-Medieval music is closely connected with the folk rock and roots music movement of the 1960s and 1970s. In many countries in Europe musicians sought to find their cultural roots, reviving music that had largely died out as a result of centuries of industrialization, and decades of exposure to United States music styles like jazz and rock.

In Great Britain, too, prog rock bands like Jethro Tull would often write songs with a Medieval touch. It was not until the late 1980s, however, that neo-Medieval music would arise as an entire genre of its own, replete with a subculture following.

The Australian outfit Dead Can Dance, who released most of their most famous works in the latter half of the 1980s, were another early influence on the scene. Dead Can Dance had a more symphonic sound than previous acts, and, although never considering themselves to be a goth band, were popular among goths. This formed the precedent of neo-Medieval music being particularly popular in the Goth scene.

1989 saw the formation of the German band Corvus Corax, two members of which were on the run from the disintegrating East German regime. In the 1990s, Corvus Corax would go on to have a profound effect on neo-Medieval music. Corvus Corax, along with other bands, started the now popular strategy of combining Medieval music with electronic music.

More recently, the band Extra Life has combined aspects of early music with the modern genre of math rock.

Neo-Medieval and neo-Renaissance qualities have been used by contemporary composers like Mamoru Fujieda and Michael Waller, with their use of modal cells and subtle counterpoint.

Popular music
Medieval music